Garrigues is a commune in the Hérault département in Occitanie in southern France.

Population

Its inhabitants are called Garrigois.

See also
Communes of the Hérault department

References

Communes of Hérault